Misau is a Local Government Area of Bauchi State, Nigeria. Its headquarters are in the town of Misau. It was founded by Hamman Mangan who ruled as an unofficial King for a period of 25 years at around 1850 AD.
 
It has an area of 1,226 km and a population of 263,487 at the 2006 census.

The postal code of the area is 750.

References

Local Government Areas in Bauchi State